Tobias Henneböle (born 19 May 1992) is a German former professional footballer who played as a central defender.

Club career
Born in Bad Soden, Henneböle started his career at JFC Werheim in 1997, aged five. In 2004, he moved to Eintracht Frankfurt, being four years in the club's youth setup before joining FSV Frankfurt.

Henneböle made his senior debuts with the latter's B-side in the 2010–11 campaign, in Regionalliga. On 29 August 2012, he moved to another reserve team, VfL Wolfsburg II in the same division.

In July 2015 Henneböle joined RCD Mallorca on a trial basis, and signed a two-year deal with the club on 3 August. He made his professional debut on 22 August, playing the full 90 minutes in a 2–0 Segunda División away loss against AD Alcorcón.

References

External links

1992 births
Living people
German footballers
Association football defenders
Regionalliga players
Segunda División players
FSV Frankfurt players
VfL Wolfsburg II players
RCD Mallorca players
SV Eintracht Trier 05 players
Borussia Fulda players
German expatriate footballers
German expatriate sportspeople in Spain
Expatriate footballers in Spain